The All Brandy Stakes is an American Thoroughbred horse race held annually in autumn, usually in November, at Laurel Park Racecourse in Laurel, Maryland. It is open to fillies and mares three years old and up and is raced on turf at a distance of 1-1/8 miles (9 furlongs).

The race was named in honor of the Maryland-Bred Champion All Brandy, who was named Champion three-year-old filly in 1962. She was bred by John A. Manfuso Sr. the former owner of the Maryland Jockey Club. Manfuso rated her as the best racehorse he had bred in over 50 years in the business. Born in 1959, All Brandy was sired by Double Brandy and out of Alluring. She had career earnings of $85,943, winning the Barbara Fritchie Handicap,  Mermaid Stakes,  Monumental Stakes and Eastern Shore Stakes and placed in three other stakes races. Although none off her offspring  performed well at the track, All Brandy was the granddam of 1981 Maryland champion two-year-old colt A Magic Spray, who earned over $470,000. All Brandy was euthanized due to infirmities of old age at her breeder's Osufnam Farm in 1987 at the age of 28. 

The race was taken off the Turf and run on the dirt track due to weather conditions on three occasions; 1970, 1993 and 2004.

Records

Speed record: 
 1 mile - 1:46.40 - Proud Run  (1999) 
 1-1/8 miles - 1:35.20 - Phoebe's Fancy  (1980)

Most wins by a jockey:
 3 - Leroy Moyers     (1975, 1977, 1981)

Most wins by a trainer:
 3 - Richard W. Small    (1994, 1996, 2006)
 3 - Ronald Cartwright    (1993, 1995, 2005)

Winners of the All Brandy Stakes since 1970

See also 

 All Brandy Stakes top three finishers

References

 Thoroughbred Database, Stakes Races

1970 establishments in Maryland
Laurel Park Racecourse
Horse races in Maryland
Recurring sporting events established in 1970